Jason Alexander (born 1959) is an American actor, comedian and voice actor.

Jason Alexander may also refer to:

Jason Alexander (rugby union), South African rugby union player
Jason Alexander (baseball), baseball player
Jason Allen Alexander, childhood friend and one-time husband of Britney Spears
Jason Shawn Alexander (born 1975), comic-book artist
Jace Alexander (born 1964), born Jason Alexander, American television director and actor

See also
J. Alexander (disambiguation)
Alexander (surname)